Madasphecia puera is a moth of the family Sesiidae. It is known from eastern Madagascar. This species is attracted to ultraviolet light.

References

Sesiidae
Moths described in 1957
Moths of Madagascar
Moths of Africa